Kevin Prindiville Farley (born June 8, 1965) is an American actor, comedian, writer, producer and director. He is a brother of late American comedian and actor Chris Farley.

Early life
Farley was born in Madison, Wisconsin, the son of Mary Anne (née Crosby), a homemaker, and Thomas Farley, who owned an oil company, Scotch Oil. He is the younger brother of late comic Chris Farley and older brother of actor John P. Farley. Like Chris, Kevin attended and graduated from Marquette University.

Career
Farley portrayed Doug Linus in the fictional boy band 2ge+her. He has appeared alongside many of his brother Chris' Saturday Night Live castmates, such as David Spade and Adam Sandler. He was credited in Tommy Boy, Black Sheep, and Beverly Hills Ninja. He was a regular performer in Sports Bar, a sketch-comedy show that ran from 1997 to 1998. He appeared in The Waterboy and in Dirty Work. He also appeared as Ketchup Boy in a "Cooking With Randy" sketch on All That with his brother, Chris, and Kenan Thompson. 

He played a cop in the 2001 film Joe Dirt, starring David Spade.

In 2004, Farley guest-starred as Bud the Janitor on the Nickelodeon television series Drake & Josh in the season 2 episode entitled "Honor Council", and in 2006 as Cop #1 in the season 4 episode entitled "The Wedding", where he gave Drake Parker and Josh Nichols a parking ticket in a 1970s Chevrolet El Camino for parking in a prohibited area.

In 2005, Farley appeared in the Lifehouse video for the band's single "Blind".  He portrayed a neglectful father who brings different women home, where he lives with his daughter, played by Tina Majorino.

Farley appeared on the HBO series Curb Your Enthusiasm as an exterminator in the episode "The Rat Dog". Farley was also in a Dairy Queen commercial advertising the Kit Kat Blizzard, commercials for Hertz Rent-A-Car, and portrayed Felix the limo driver on Disney's That's So Raven. He also starred in the political parody movie An American Carol, with Kelsey Grammer and Jon Voight, in 2008. Farley appeared on The View on September 30, 2008 to promote the movie.

In 2007, Farley was featured in the web serial Two Guys Drinking at a Bar.

Farley appeared at the 2008 Republican National Convention, and during an interview with 97.1 FM Talk's Jamie Allman, he identified his politics as mostly conservative.

Farley appeared as the kidnapped beer truck driver in the 2010 music video for "This Afternoon" by Nickelback.

In May 2010, Farley appeared as a guest on Tom Green's House Tonight, where he performed a section of his new stand-up routine.

Farley directed the film Hollywood & Wine, which was released in 2011.

On May 9, 2013, Farley was a featured guest for Sirius/XM radio on the Jason Ellis Show.

In 2013, Paranormal Movie, a spoof film of Paranormal Activity, was released. Farley directed and also co-stars in the film, alongside his brother, John, Carly Craig, Nicky Whelan, William Katt, Tom Sizemore, Maria Menounos, Kevin Sorbo, Quinton Aaron, Deep Roy, and Academy Award nominee Eric Roberts. The same year, he also starred in an episode of Rules of Engagement.

In 2015, Farley appeared in the documentary I Am Chris Farley, about the life of his brother, Chris, alongside his brother, John, and many other Hollywood stars, such as Adam Sandler and Dan Aykroyd. He also filmed the independent film Crowning Jules in South Bend, Indiana. In 2015, Farley, along with Jaleel White and Pauly Shore, appeared on the series Hawaii Five-0 in the Season 5 episode "Ho'amoano (Chasing Yesterday)", which aired on April 24, 2015.

In 2016, he made a guest appearance as Turkey in the It's Always Sunny in Philadelphia season 11 episode "The Gang Hits the Slopes". He also made a guest appearance as the NRA card-carrying, gun-toting protester, Eric, in the Superstore season 2 episode, "Guns, Pills and Birds".

In 2017, Farley appeared as Earl in the music video for the Rascal Flatts' single "Yours If You Want It", alongside Kristy Swanson.

References

External links 
 
 

1965 births
American male composers
21st-century American composers
American male film actors
Living people
Male actors from Wisconsin
Marquette University alumni
Actors from Madison, Wisconsin
2gether (band) members
21st-century American male musicians
American male comedians